Christopher Truswell (born 31 January 1966), is an English-born Australian actor, musician and voice-over best known as Gerald "Nudge" Noritas in the Australian TV sitcom Hey Dad..! He voiced the character of Rune Haako in the film Star Wars: Episode II – Attack of the Clones which was filmed in Sydney, Australia. Truswell got his first acting role at aged 17, in the Australian film Fast Talking playing the character Moose.

Truswell also had a guest role in an episode of Australian hospital drama All Saints and Packed to the Rafters.

Truswell also appeared in the third installment of the TV series Underbelly.

Selected filmography
Fast Talking (1984) - Moose
Candy Regentag (1989) - Leo
Star Wars: Episode II – Attack of the Clones (2002) - RIC-920 / Rune Haako / Shu Mai / San Hill / Wat Tambor / Sun Fac (voice, uncredited)
Ned (2003) - Nudge

References

External links
 

1966 births
Living people
Australian male television actors
Australian male voice actors